Penrhyn Bay ( "headland bay") is a small town on the northern coast of Wales, in Conwy county borough, within the parish or community of Llandudno, and part of the ecclesiastical parish of Llanrhos. It is a prosperous village, with a cluster of local shops, a pub, a parish church and a modern medical centre with doctors' surgery at the foot of the pass over the shoulder of the Little Orme from Llandudno Bay. Here there is a highschool called Ysgol y Creuddyn and a primary school called Ysgol Glanwydden. It is considered to be a residential suburb of Llandudno lying east of the Little Orme. It adjoins the resort of Rhos-on-Sea and covers a large part of the Creuddyn peninsula. The population of Penrhyn Ward at the 2011 census was 4,883.

History 

The oldest building in Penrhyn Bay is Penrhyn Old Hall dating from the early 15th century. It was the home of the Pugh family whose fortunes faded through their adherence to the Catholic religion when their neighbours accepted Protestantism. On 14 April 1587, printing material for Catholic literature was found in a cave on the Little Orme, where it had been used by the recusant Robert Pugh (squire of Penrhyn Hall) and his chaplain William Davies to print Y Drych Gristianogawl ('The Christian Mirror'). They had taken refuge there during the persecution of Catholics instigated by Queen Elizabeth I in May 1586. In the grounds of the hall are the ruins of the medieval chapel of the Blessed Virgin Mary of Penrhyn, last used by the Church in Wales for public worship c1930. The Pugh family also held a charter and built a windmill to serve their land in the nearby village of Glanwydden the first charter dating 1580. The hall now serves as a pub and restaurant.

Originally a small farming community, Penrhyn Bay came to rely heavily on the employment opportunities of the limestone quarry operating since the mid-19th century, and served by its own narrow gauge railway, but quarrying ceased in 1936. However, Penrhyn Bay expanded rapidly in the 20th century to become a desirable suburb of Llandudno, with developments taking place in the 1930s, 1950s and 1960s. Most recently, in the 1990s, further large development of family homes took place to the south of the town. The village also has a school called Ysgol Glanwydden which was built in 1910.

Celebrity connections 
The highly popular singing duo Anne Ziegler and Webster Booth retired to a small bungalow in Penrhyn Bay after their return to the United Kingdom from South Africa in 1976, until their deaths.

It provided a location for an episode of TV's Hetty Wainthropp Investigates television series (Childsplay), which starred Patricia Routledge. Also Rocket's Island.

References

Ivor Wynne Jones. Llandudno Queen of Welsh Resorts Landmark, Ashbourne Derbyshire 2002  .

External links

 Cytûn - Church Services in Llandudno and Penrhyn Bay
 www.geograph.co.uk : photos of Penrhyn Bay and surrounding area
 Penrhyn Bay Presbyterian Church

Villages in Conwy County Borough
Llandudno
Populated coastal places in Wales